Frances Elizabeth Holberton (March 7, 1917 – December 8, 2001) was an American computer scientist who was one of the six original programmers of the first general-purpose electronic digital computer, ENIAC. The other five ENIAC programmers were Jean Bartik, Ruth Teitelbaum, Kathleen Antonelli, Marlyn Meltzer, and Frances Spence.

Holberton invented breakpoints in computer debugging.

Early life and education
Holberton was born Frances Elizabeth Snyder in Philadelphia, Pennsylvania in 1917. Her father was John Amos Snyder (1884–1963), her mother was Frances J. Morrow (1892–1981), and she was the third child in a family of eight children.

Holberton studied journalism, because its curriculum let her travel far afield. Journalism was also one of the few fields open to women as a career in the 1940s. On her first day of classes at the University of Pennsylvania, her math professor asked her if she wouldn't be better off at home raising children.

Career
During World War 2 while the U.S. Army needed to compute ballistics trajectories, many women were hired for this task. Holberton was hired by the Moore School of Engineering to work as a "computer" and chosen to be one of the six women to program the ENIAC.  The ENIAC stood for Electronic Numerical Integrator And Computer. Classified as "subprofessionals", Holberton, along with Kay McNulty, Marlyn Wescoff, Ruth Lichterman, Betty Jean Jennings, and Fran Bilas, programmed the ENIAC to perform calculations for ballistics trajectories electronically for the Army's Ballistic Research Laboratory.
In the beginning, because the ENIAC was classified, the women were only allowed to work with blueprints and wiring diagrams in order to program it. During her time working on ENIAC she had many productive ideas that came to her overnight, leading other programmers to jokingly state that she "solved more problems in her sleep than other people did awake."

The ENIAC was unveiled on February 15, 1946, at the University of Pennsylvania. It cost around $487,000, .

After World War II, Holberton worked at Remington Rand and the National Bureau of Standards. She was the Chief of the Programming Research Branch, Applied Mathematics Laboratory at the David Taylor Model Basin in 1959. She helped to develop the UNIVAC, designing control panels that put the numeric keypad next to the keyboard and persuading engineers to replace the Univac's black exterior with the gray-beige tone that came to be the universal color of computers.

She was one of those who wrote the first generative programming system (SORT/MERGE). Holberton used a deck of playing cards to develop the decision tree for the binary sort function, and wrote the code to employ a group of ten tape drives to read and write data as needed during the process. She wrote the first statistical analysis package, which was used for the 1950 US Census.

In 1953 she was made a supervisor of advanced programming in a part of the Navy’s Applied Math lab in Maryland, where she stayed until 1966. Holberton worked with John Mauchly to develop the C-10 instruction set for BINAC, which is considered to be the prototype of all modern programming languages. She also participated in the development of early standards for the COBOL and FORTRAN programming languages with Grace Hopper.   Later, as an employee of the National Bureau of Standards, she was very active in the first two revisions of the Fortran language standard ("FORTRAN 77" and "Fortran 90").

Death
She died on December 8, 2001, in Rockville, Maryland, aged 84, of heart disease, diabetes, and complications from a stroke she had suffered several years before. She was survived by her husband John Vaughn Holberton and her daughters Pamela and Priscilla.

Awards
In 1976, Holberton was honored with a Department of Commerce Silver Medal in recognition of her work on revision of the national standard for FORTRAN and the development of test routines to test compliance.

In 1997 she was the only woman of the original six who programmed the ENIAC to receive the Augusta Ada Lovelace Award, the highest award given by the Association of Women in Computing.

That same year, she received the IEEE Computer Pioneer Award from the IEEE Computer Society for developing the sort/merge generator which, according to IEEE, "inspired the first ideas about compilation."

Also in 1997, she was inducted into the Women in Technology International Hall of Fame, along with the other original ENIAC programmers.

Legacy 
The Holberton School, a project-based school for software engineers based in San Francisco, was founded in her honor in 2015.

In 2010, a documentary called, Top Secret Rosies: The Female "Computers" of WWII was released. The film centered around in-depth interviews of three of the six women programmers, focusing on the commendable patriotic contributions they made during World War II.

The ENIAC team is the inspiration behind the award-winning 2013 documentary The Computers. This documentary, created by Kathy Kleiman and the ENIAC Programmers Project, combines actual footage of the ENIAC team from the 1940s with interviews with the female team members as they reflect on their time working together on the ENIAC. It is the first documentary of a series of three, with the other two entitled The Coders and The Future-Maker, respectively.

See also
Women in Technology International
Timeline of women in science

References

External links
 at the Association for Women in Computing website
Computer pioneer Betty Holberton dies at 84 , Government Computer News, January 5, 2002
Two oral history interviews with Frances E. Holberton. Charles Babbage Institute, University of Minnesota, Minneapolis.  UNIVAC Conference (May 17–18, 1990) as well as interview by James Baker Ross (April 14, 1983).  In the latter, Holberton discusses her education from 1940 through the 1960s and her experiences in the computing field. These include work with the Eckert-Mauchly Computer Corporation, David Taylor Model Basin, and the National Bureau of Standards. She discusses her perceptions of cooperation and competition between members of these organizations and the difficulties she encountered as a woman. She recounts her work on the ENIAC and LARC computers, her design of operating systems, and her applications programming.
Frances E. Holberton Papers, circa 1950s–1980s. Charles Babbage Institute, University of Minnesota.

Further reading
 
 
 

1917 births
2001 deaths
20th-century American scientists
20th-century American women scientists
Scientists from Philadelphia
American computer programmers
American computer scientists
American women computer scientists
Human computers
COBOL
Recipients of the Department of Commerce Silver Medal